Berga is the capital of the comarca (county) of Berguedà, in the province of Barcelona, Catalonia, Spain. It is bordered by the municipalities of Cercs, Olvan, Avià, Capolat and Castellar del Riu.

History 
Berga derives its name from the Bergistani, an Iberian tribe which lived in the area before the Roman conquest. The Bergistani were first subdued by Hannibal in 218 BC. They rebelled twice against the Romans and were twice defeated; after their second uprising, much of the tribe was sold into slavery. Livy mentions their principal town, which was probably the precursor of the present-day town of Berga.

Berga was ruled by viscounts in the Early Middle Ages and had its own counts from 988.

Berga was sold to king Peter II of Aragon in 1199.

In May 2012, the town council passed a motion declaring King Juan Carlos 'persona non grata' following a series of scandals involving the royal family, most notably the king's recent elephant hunting trip to Africa in the middle of Spain's deepening recession.

La Patum 
Berga is perhaps most famous for its traditional festival of "La Patum", a celebration which occurs every Corpus Christi, lasting for five days.

Free Software Street 
On July 3, 2010 the world's first Free Software Street was inaugurated in Berga, during a ceremony attended by Richard Stallman.

Sister cities 
  Guernica, Basque Country, Spain
  Tarascon-sur-Ariège, France
  Högsby, Sweden

Notable people
Alfonsina Bueno
Antonio Comellas y Cluet
José Cunill Postius

See also
La Guita Xica

References

External links 
 
 Government data pages 

Municipalities in Berguedà
Populated places in Berguedà